Erny-Saint-Julien is a commune in the Pas-de-Calais department in the Hauts-de-France region of France.

Geography
It is surrounded by the communes Bomy, Enquin-les-Mines and Fléchin.

Population

Places of interest
 The church of St.Julien, dating from the nineteenth century, with some Gallo-Roman finds in the foundations.
 Traces of an ancient château.

See also
Communes of the Pas-de-Calais department

References

Ernysaintjulien